David Schiff (born August 30, 1945 in New York City) is an American composer, writer and conductor whose music draws on elements of jazz, rock, and klezmer styles, showing the influence of composers as diverse as Stravinsky, Mahler, Charles Mingus, Eric Dolphy and Terry Riley. His music has been performed by major orchestras and festivals around the United States and by soloists David Shifrin, Regina Carter, David Taylor, Marty Ehrlich, David Krakauer, Nadine Asin and Peter Kogan. He is the author of books on the music of Elliott Carter, George Gershwin and Duke Ellington. His work has been honored by the League-ISCM National Composers Competition award and the ASCAP-Deems Taylor award for his book on Elliott Carter.

Biography 

Schiff grew up in the Bronx and New Rochelle, New York, started playing piano when he was four and composing when he was nine. He received a B.A in English literature from Columbia University in 1967 and an M.A. from Cambridge University, where he was a Kellett Fellow at Clare College, in 1970. After pursuing graduate study in English at Columbia Schiff received an MM from the Manhattan School of Music in 1974 and a DMA From the Juilliard School in 1979. Among his teachers were James Wimer, Irwin Stahl, Roger Smalley, Ludmilla Ulehla, John Corigliano, Ursula Mamlok and Elliott Carter. While studying with Carter at Juilliard, Schiff was awarded the League-ISCM National Composers Competition for his Elegy for String Quartet and also oversaw the world premiere of his opera Gimpel the Fool (libretto by I. B. Singer). Since 1980 Schiff has taught at Reed College Portland, Oregon. He is married to Cantor Judith Blanc Schiff and they have two children.

Compositions 

Schiff has composed works for musical theater, worship, orchestra and various chamber ensembles including large and small jazz orchestras. Principal works are:

Musical theater 
Gimpel the Fool.  Opera in two acts. Libretto by I. B. Singer (Two recordings on Naxos)
Vashti or The Whole Megillah. Chamber opera for mezzo-soprano, clarinet and piano.
A Little Proust Opera (from All About Love). Chamber opera for mezzo-soprano, tenor and small ensemble.

Orchestra music 
Slow Dance (1989) composed for the Oregon Symphony
Stomp (1990) composed for Concordia
Speaking in Drums (timpani concerto) (1994) composed for the Minnesota Orchestra
Bridge City (1996) for orchestra and blues band, written for the Oregon Symphony
4 Sisters (jazz violin concerto) (1997), American premiere by the Detroit Symphony
Canti di Davide (clarinet concerto) (2001) composed for the Virginia Symphony
Canzona for brass, percussion and strings (2005) composed for the Seattle Symphony
Infernal (2007) composed for the Seattle Symphony
Stomp Re-Lit (2009) composed for the American Composers Orchestra

Choral music 
Peace
Psalm 121

Synagogue music 
Sacred Service (1983)
Wedding service (1984)
Psalm 150 (2008)

Chamber music 
Joycesketch II for solo viola (1981)
Divertimento from Gimpel the Fool (1982)* 
Scenes from Adolescence (1987)*
Solus Rex (1992) composed for the Chamber Music Society of Lincoln Center
New York Nocturnes (2000)*
After Hours (2001) composed for the Aspen Music Festival
All About Love (2005)*
Singing in the Dark (2006)*
Nonet (2007)*
Borscht Belt Follies (2010)*
Class of 1915 (2012)*
starred numbers premiered by Chamber Music Northwest, Portland Oregon.

Jazz ensembles 
Shtik (1992)
Low Life (1998)

Books and articles 
Schiff has written frequently on music for the New York Times, the Atlantic Monthly, Tempo, the Times Literary Supplement (London)  and the Nation. His books include

The Music of Elliott Carter (first edition, Eulenberg Books,1983; second edition, Faber and Cornell University Press,  1998)
George Gershwin: Rhapsody in Blue (1997) Cambridge Music Handbook.
The Ellington Century (2012) University of California Press.

He also has written entries on Leonard Bernstein and Elliott Carter for the New Grove Dictionary of Music and Musicians.

References

External links
 
 Keiser Southern Music

1945 births
Living people
20th-century classical composers
20th-century American composers
20th-century American male musicians
21st-century classical composers
21st-century American composers
21st-century American male musicians
American classical composers
American male classical composers
Classical musicians from New York (state)
Jewish composers
Jewish opera composers
Musicians from New Rochelle, New York
Alumni of Clare College, Cambridge
Columbia College (New York) alumni
Juilliard School alumni
Manhattan School of Music alumni
Reed College faculty